Boophis doulioti is a species of frog in the family Mantellidae.
It is endemic to Madagascar.
Its natural habitats are subtropical or tropical dry forests, dry savanna, moist savanna, subtropical or tropical dry shrubland, subtropical or tropical moist shrubland, swamps, intermittent freshwater marshes, pastureland, seasonally flooded agricultural land, and canals and ditches.

References

doulioti
Endemic frogs of Madagascar
Taxa named by Fernand Angel
Amphibians described in 1934
Taxonomy articles created by Polbot